Brian Tichy (born August 18, 1968) is an American musician, best known as having been the drummer for Whitesnake, Billy Idol, Foreigner, Sass Jordan, and Ozzy Osbourne. He was the drummer of Whitesnake from 2010 to 2013. His surname means silent in Czech, Slovak and other Slavic languages. In 2015, he became a full-time member of Operation: Mindcrime and The Dead Daisies.

Career
Tichy began playing drums at age eight and started playing guitar at age 12. His earliest influences include Kiss with Peter Criss as his main influence, Led Zeppelin, Iron Maiden with Nicko McBrain, Aerosmith, AC/DC, and Van Halen

Since attending Berklee College of Music from 1986 until 1990, Tichy has toured/recorded with a multitude of artists including Billy Idol, Ozzy Osbourne, Seether, Velvet Revolver, Foreigner, Pride & Glory, Glenn Hughes, Sass Jordan, Slash's Snakepit, China Rain, Whitesnake and most recently The Dead Daisies.

Ball

While Tichy has primarily toured and recorded with others playing drums, he has fronted his own band, Ball, in which he sings and plays guitar.  Due to the demise of his record label (Time Bomb Recordings), Ball's American Aggression CD never was formally released.  Ball did manage to release a CD, The Grand Human Disaster Scenario (only in Japan) in May 1999. This CD contains what were essentially the demos that led to the record deal with Time Bomb at the end of 1999. His increasing role as co-songwriter with Billy Idol that started at the end of 2003 limited his time to focus on Ball.

Billy Idol
The Idol/Tichy writing partnership sparked the recording of Billy Idol's first CD since 1993. Devil's Playground (Sanctuary Records) was recorded in 2004 and contained 8 Idol/Tichy tracks. The CD was released in March 2005 and they toured for the remainder of the year.

While writing in 2006 for a follow up Idol CD, Tichy and Idol recorded a Christmas album. This was done on their own, in Idol and Tichy's rehearsal studio with Tichy performing drums, guitar, and bass, as well as engineering and co-producing. Happy Holidays by Idol was released in November 2006 through Best Buy and in Europe.

Foreigner
Tichy joined Foreigner in 1998 and remained until 2000. He rejoined briefly in 2007 substituting for Jason Bonham. He then returned from 2008 until 2010, recording the album Can't Slow Down. He returned for one show in summer 2011, substituting for Mark Schulman, who had recently lost his father. Tichy rejoined Foreigner for the month of August 2012 for live performances, replacing the departed Schulman once again.

Other projects
Tichy filled in for Seether drummer John Humphrey in April 2007, toured with Foreigner through spring of 2009 (replacing Jason Bonham), and recently completed a multi-year involvement with Billy Idol.  He has written music for television and film, and recorded with European female metal singer Marya Roxx.
On September 25, 2010, Tichy organized, produced and played in the drummer tribute "Bonzo, The Groove Remains the Same", commemorating the 30th anniversary of the death of Led Zeppelin's John Bonham.  In 2011, Tichy formed S.U.N. (Something Unto Nothing) as guitarist, with vocalist Sass Jordan, bassist Michael Devin, and drummer Tommy Stewart.  In 2014, Tichy joined 'Sweet & Lynch', featuring Michael Sweet, George Lynch and James Lomenzo.

Whitesnake

Tichy was announced as the new drummer for Whitesnake on June 18, 2010. After several years of worldwide touring, Tichy quit Whitesnake on January 4, 2013, as he planned to focus more time on S.U.N.

Speed bag

Tichy became a speed bag enthusiast while on tour with Foreigner and quickly got with some of the best speed baggers around to learn and increase his own skills. During the 2009–10 tour with Foreigner, Tichy hung several speed bag wall units inside the bands equipment truck and created the infamous "Speed Bag Truck", hosting area speed bag enthusiasts from various areas when the band played in their town. Some of the best speed bag talent in the U.S. joined Tichy in the truck before concerts, punching away. Soon after, he began promoting his own punching skills via his YouTube videos for both physical fitness, and also as a musical instrument. He always planned to incorporate the speed bag into his drumkit, which was first unveiled during his appearance on "That Metal Show" on VH-1 classic, in April 2012, using a UBS1 freestanding floor frame from Balazboxing. This is the first known inclusion of a speed bag by a professional drummer as a rhythm instrument in a major public appearance and is an important date in speed bag history.

Discography and touring 
With Something Unto Nothing
 2013

With Dead Daisies
 2014: Face I Love
 2016: Make Some Noise
 2022: Radiance
With Billy Idol
 2005: Devil's Playground
 2006: Happy Holidays Billy Idol Co-produced, recorded, engineered and mixed by Tichy and Idol. All
instruments performed by Tichy except keys by Derek Sherinian
 2008: The Very Best of Billy Idol: Idolize Yourself
 Touring drummer since 2001; US, Europe, Canada

With Derek Sherinian
 2003: Black Utopia
 2004: Mythology
 2006: Blood of the Snake
 2009: Molecular Heinosity

With Kenny Wayne Shepherd
 2004: The Place You're In

With Ball
 1999: Grand Human Disaster Scenario (Japan only)
 2000: American Aggression (Only available through BrianTichy.com)
 2001: A Study in Persistence (Only available through BrianTichy.com)
 2003: Bleed Defeat (Only available through BrianTichy.com)
 
With Gilby Clarke
 1998: Rubber
 2002: Swag
 2007: Gilby Clarke; Best Of
 Various years of touring US

With Vinnie Moore
 1996: Out of Nowhere
 Toured '91 and '92, opened 10 shows for Rush

With Ana Sidel
 2005: "A Solas..."
 (8 tracks) recorded
 
With Nicklebag
 1996: 12 Hits & a Bump
 1997: Mas Feedback
 Japan and US touring
 
With Stevie Salas
 1993: Presents: The Electric Pow Wow
 1994: Back From The Living
 1996: Anthology 1987–1994
 1997: Le Bootleg (Live In Paris)
 1997: Seoul Power
 1998: The Sometimes Almost Never Was
 2001: Shapeshifter (The Fall And Rise Of Stevie No Wonder)
 Various years of touring Japan and Europe

With Pride & Glory
 1994: Pride & Glory
 Toured US, Europe, Japan
 
With B'z
 2000: "Juice"
 2000: Eleven
 2003: Big Machine
 2019: New Love
 2022: Highway X

With TMG
 2004: TMG I

With Sass Jordan
 1994:  Rats and Summer Tour

With Tommy Shaw and Jack Blades
 2007: Shaw/Blades: "Influences" (8 tracks) recorded in 2004

With Jack Blades
 2012: Rock 'N Roll Ride (4 tracks)

With Whitesnake
 2011: Forevermore
 2013: Made in Japan

For MasterSource Music Catalog
 Since 2000: Chief rock songwriter. MasterSource gets music placed in TV and movies. Tichy's include;
Law & Order, CSI: Crime Scene Investigation, The 40-Year-Old Virgin, Supergroup, The Osbournes, Punk'd, Pimp My Ride, and countless others.

Other projects
 1991: Randy Jackson's China Rain – Bed of Nails
 1992: RawHead – Flounder
 1993: The Gallows Humor - "In Dying Need"
 1994: The Gallows Humor - "What You Hear In The Dark" (Appears on 2 tracks: "Walking The Dogma" & "Mozart, Joyce and Sodomy")
 1994: Guitar's Practicing Musicians, Vol. 3 (Pride & Glory – "The Wizard")
 1997: Return of the Comet – Tribute to Ace Frehley; "Rip It Out", all instruments and vox...
 1998: Taisuke – Heavy Pop
 1999: Shameless – Backstreet Anthems
 2000: Shameless – Queen 4 a Day
 2001: Sweet Emotion – The Songs of Aerosmith Tribute
 2004: Richie Kotzen – Shapes of Things to Come (bonus track)
 2005: Iron Maiden Tribute: Numbers from the Beast; "Run to the Hills" with Michael Schenker and Tony Franklin
 2006: The Beatles Tribute: Butchering the Beatles; "Tomorrow Never Knows" with Billy idol, Steve Stevens and Blasko
 2006: Marco Mendoza: Live for Tomorrow (3 tracks)
 2007: Maarja:  Produced by Kevin Shirley (Zeppelin, Maiden) featuring Derek Sherinian, Paul Crook and Scott Metaxes
 2009: Ace Frehley: Anomaly – "Fox on the Run"
 September 25, 2010: Produced Bonzo, The Groove Remains the Same, first ever tribute to John Bonham, drummer of Led Zeppelin.
 2011: Steven Tyler – "(It) Feels So Good"
 2013: Steve Saluto: 12
 2015 Lynch Mob- Rebel

Other artists Tichy has toured with:
 1995: Slash's Snakepit (1995 World Tour)
 1998–2000: Foreigner
 2000: Ozzy Osbourne (Ozzfest 2000)
 2001: Glenn Hughes
 2005: Velvet Revolver  (three-week fill-in for Matt Sorum due to hand injury)
 2006–07: Foreigner (fill-in dates for current Foreigner drummer Jason Bonham)
 2007: Seether  (one-month fill-in for festivals)
 2010: The Guess Who (fill-in)
 2013: Geoff Tate (fill-in)
 2014: Geoff Tate (fill-in)

References

External links

The official Brian Tichy website
Brian Tichy interview for the Russian website about Whitesnake
2012 Audio Interview with Brian Tichy from the Podcast "I'd Hit That"

1968 births
Living people
People from Denville, New Jersey
Foreigner (band) members
The Ozzy Osbourne Band members
American heavy metal drummers
Berklee College of Music alumni
Musicians from New Jersey
The Dead Daisies members
20th-century American drummers
American male drummers
Whitesnake members
Pride and Glory (band) members
Operation: Mindcrime (band) members
Seether members
Tak Matsumoto Group members